Ibertsberger is a surname. Notable people with the surname include:

 Andreas Ibertsberger (born 1982), Austrian footballer
 Lukas Ibertsberger (born 2003), Austrian footballer
 Robert Ibertsberger (born 1977), Austrian footballer and manager